Skui is a district in the municipality of Bærum, Norway. Together with the district Emma Hjort, its population (2007) is 6,281.

People from Skui 
 Ola Gjeilo, composer

References

Villages in Akershus
Bærum